Piskon (Paskan, Yaghnobi: Пискон, پسکان) is a village in Sughd Region, northwestern Tajikistan. It is part of the jamoat Anzob in the Ayni District. Its population was 68 in 2007.

Notes

References

Populated places in Sughd Region
Yaghnob